Tipp may refer to:

 "Tipp", a nickname of Thomas Agro (1931–1987), New York mobster
 Tipp FM, a radio station serving County Tipperary, Ireland
 County Tipperary, Ireland
 Tipperary (town), a town in County Tipperary
 Tipp City, Ohio, United States

See also
 Tom Tipps (1923–2013), American businessman and politician
 Tip (disambiguation)
 Transatlantic Trade and Investment Partnership (TTIP)